Sanford-Fritch Independent School District is a public school district based in Fritch, Texas (USA).

In addition to Fritch, the district serves the city of Sanford as well as rural areas in southwestern Hutchinson County. Small portions of Carson and Moore counties also lie within the district.

In 2009, the school district was rated "academically acceptable" by the Texas Education Agency.

In 2015, the school district received the highest accountability rating of "Met Standard" by the Texas Education Agency.

Sanford-Fritch is the home of the "Eagles", their mascot.

According to the districts website, the current Superintendent is Jim McClellan.

Schools
Sanford-Fritch High (Grades 9–12)
Sanford-Fritch Junior High (Grades 6–8)
Sanford-Fritch Elementary (Grades PK-5)

Other buildings
Sanford-Fritch Administration Building

References

External links
Sanford-Fritch ISD

School districts in Hutchinson County, Texas
School districts in Carson County, Texas
School districts in Moore County, Texas